Sarah Jane Abad is a Filipino former actor.

Career 

Abad's first film role was in "Kung Ako'y Iiwan Mo" in 1993, where she played one of the three children of Gabby Concepcion and Lorna Tolentino's characters. Both Abad and older sister Kaye Abad auditioned for the role, the older sibling was originally picked for the role but Abad had to take over when the role of the father was recast. For the said role, she was awarded Best Child Performer in the 19th Metro Manila Film Festival. Abad is mostly remembered in Kung Mawawala Ka Pa, where she played the leukemia-stricken Charina, daughter to Christopher de Leon and Dawn Zulueta's characters.

In 1994, Abad appeared in the action-comedy film Tunay na Magkaibigan, Walang Iwanan... Peksman with Vic Sotto and Phillip Salvador.

In recent years, she had appearances in the films We Will Not Die Tonight, Bloody Crayons and Historiographika Errata.

Personal life 

Abad's older sister is actor Kaye Abad.

Abad was formerly married to Kamikazee frontman Jay Contreras. The couple married in a black-themed wedding in January 2009. Abad confirmed the separation in an Instagram story in May 2020. However, Abad revealed that she and contreras have remained friends and are co-parents to children Kidlat Caio and Isla Euan.

Filmography

Television

Film

Music videos

Awards and nominations

References

External links 
 

Living people
Filipino film actresses
Year of birth missing (living people)
Place of birth missing (living people)